The 2022–23 season is the 110th in the history of PSV Eindhoven and their 67th consecutive season in the top flight. PSV are participating in the Eredivisie, KNVB Cup, Johan Cruyff Shield, UEFA Champions League and UEFA Europa League.

Squad

Transfers

In

Out

Pre-season and friendlies

Competitions

Overall record

Eredivisie

League table

Results summary

Results by round

Matches 
The league fixtures were announced on 17 June 2022.

KNVB Cup

Johan Cruyff Shield

UEFA Champions League

Third qualifying round
The draw for the third qualifying round was held on 18 July 2022.

Play-off round 
The draw for the play-off round was held on 2 August 2022.

UEFA Europa League

Group stage 

The draw for the group stage was held on 26 August 2022.

Knockout phase

Knockout round play-offs
The knockout round play-offs draw was held on 7 November 2022.

Statistics

Appearances and goals

|-
! colspan="18" style="background:#dcdcdc; text-align:center"| Goalkeepers

|-
! colspan="18" style="background:#dcdcdc; text-align:center"| Defenders

|-
! colspan="18" style="background:#dcdcdc; text-align:center"| Midfielders

|-
! colspan="18" style="background:#dcdcdc; text-align:center"| Forwards

|-
! colspan="18" style="background:#dcdcdc; text-align:center"| Players transferred out during the season

|}

Notes

References

PSV Eindhoven seasons
PSV
PSV